Below are the full rosters and coaching staff of the teams of Minor League Baseball's Mexican League.

North Division

Algodoneros de Unión Laguna

Acereros de Monclova

Generales de Durango

Mariachis de Guadalajara

Rieleros de Aguascalientes

Saraperos de Saltillo

Sultanes de Monterrey

Tecolotes de los Dos Laredos

Toros de Tijuana

South Division

Bravos de León

Diablos Rojos del México

El Águila de Veracruz

Guerreros de Oaxaca

Leones de Yucatán

Olmecas de Tabasco

Pericos de Puebla

Piratas de Campeche

Tigres de Quintana Roo

Minor League Baseball team rosters
Mexican League